Lansing Grand River Assembly (LGR) is a General Motors owned and operated automobile assembly facility located in Lansing, Michigan, United States.  Lansing Grand River Assembly produces vehicles built upon the GM Alpha platform including the Cadillac CT4, Cadillac CT5, and Chevrolet Camaro.

The Lansing Grand River Assembly facility includes a body shop, paint shop, general assembly and central utilities complex.

History 
The Lansing Grand River Assembly complex began construction in 1999 and began operations in 2001.  It replaced the Lansing Car Assembly, Lansing Metal Center, and the Lansing Craft Center.  On September 16, 2013, Lansing Grand River Assembly Plant had produced its 1 millionth Cadillac vehicle, a 2014 Cadillac CTS sedan with Red Obsession Tintcoat body color.

Vehicles produced

Current
As of September 2022:
 Cadillac CT4/CT4-V
 Cadillac CT5/CT5-V
 Chevrolet Camaro

Former
 Cadillac ATS
 Cadillac ATS-V
 Cadillac CTS
 Cadillac CTS-V
 Cadillac SRX
 Cadillac STS
 Cadillac STS-V

References

External links
 

General Motors factories
Economy of Lansing, Michigan
Motor vehicle assembly plants in Michigan
2001 establishments in Michigan